Guo Xiaowen (July 22, 1997) is a Chinese figure skater. She competed in the final segment at the 2013 World Junior Championships in Milan and at one Grand Prix event, the 2013 Cup of China.

Programs

Competitive highlights
GP: Grand Prix; JGP: Junior Grand Prix

References

External links 

 

1997 births
Living people
Chinese female single skaters
Figure skaters from Changchun